Myrtaceae, the myrtle family, is a family of dicotyledonous plants placed within the order Myrtales. Myrtle, pōhutukawa, bay rum tree, clove, guava, acca (feijoa), allspice, and eucalyptus are some notable members of this group. All species are woody, contain essential oils, and have flower parts in multiples of four or five. The leaves are evergreen, alternate to mostly opposite, simple, and usually entire (i.e., without a toothed margin). The flowers have a base number of five petals, though in several genera, the petals are minute or absent. The stamens are usually very conspicuous, brightly coloured, and numerous.

Evolutionary history 
Scientists hypothesize that the family Myrtaceae arose between 60 and 56 million years ago (Mya) during the Paleocene era. Pollen fossils have been sourced to the ancient supercontinent Gondwana. The breakup of Gondwana during the Cretaceous period (145 to 66 Mya) geographically isolated disjunct taxa and allowed for rapid speciation; in particular, genera once considered members of the now-defunct Leptospermoideae alliance are now isolated within Oceania. Generally, experts agree that vicariance is responsible for the differentiation of Myrtaceae taxa, except in the cases of Leptospermum species now located on New Zealand and New Caledonia, islands which may have been submerged at the time of late Eocene differentiation.

Diversity 
Recent estimates suggest the Myrtaceae include about 5,950 species in about 132 genera. The family has a wide distribution in tropical and warm-temperate regions of the world, and is common in many of the world's biodiversity hotspots. Genera with capsular fruits such as Eucalyptus, Corymbia, Angophora, Leptospermum, and Melaleuca are absent from the Americas, apart from Metrosideros in Chile and Argentina. Genera with fleshy fruits have their greatest concentrations in eastern Australia and Malesia (the Australasian realm) and the Neotropics. Eucalyptus is a dominant, nearly ubiquitous genus in the more mesic parts of Australia and extends north sporadically to the Philippines. Eucalyptus regnans is the tallest flowering plant in the world. Other important Australian genera are Callistemon (bottlebrushes), Syzygium, and Melaleuca (paperbarks). Species of the genus Osbornia, native to Australasia, are mangroves. Eugenia, Myrcia, and Calyptranthes are among the larger genera in the neotropics.

Historically, the Myrtaceae were divided into two subfamilies. Subfamily Myrtoideae (about 75 genera) was recognized as having fleshy fruits and opposite, entire leaves. Most genera in this subfamily have one of three easily recognized types of embryos. The genera of Myrtoideae can be very difficult to distinguish in the absence of mature fruits. Myrtoideae are found worldwide in subtropical and tropical regions, with centers of diversity in the Neotropics, northeastern Australia, and Malesia. In contrast, subfamily Leptospermoideae (about 80 genera) was recognized as having dry, dehiscent fruits (capsules) and leaves arranged spirally or alternate. The Leptospermoideae are found mostly in Australasia, with a centre of diversity in Australia. Many genera in Western Australia have greatly reduced leaves and flowers typical of more xeric habitats.

Taxonomy 
The division of the Myrtaceae into Leptospermoideae and Myrtoideae was challenged by a number of authors, including Johnson and Briggs (1984), who identified 14 tribes or clades within Myrtaceae, and found Myrtoideae to be polyphyletic. Molecular studies by several groups of authors, as of 2008, have confirmed the baccate (fleshy) fruits evolved twice from capsular fruits and, as such, the two-subfamily classification does not accurately portray the phylogenetic history of the family. Thus, many workers are now using a recent analysis by Wilson et al. (2001) as a starting point for further analyses of the family. This study pronounced both Leptospermoideae and Myrtoideae invalid, but retained several smaller suballiances shown to be monophyletic through matK analysis.

The genera Heteropyxis and Psiloxylon have been separated as separate families by many authors in the past as Heteropyxidaceae and Psiloxylaceae. However, Wilson et al. included them in Myrtaceae. These two genera are presently believed to be the earliest arising and surviving lineages of Myrtaceae.

The most recent classification recognizes 17 tribes and two subfamilies, Myrtoideae and Psiloxyloideae, based on a phylogenetic analysis of plastid DNA.

Many new species are being described annually from throughout the range of Myrtaceae. Likewise, new genera are being described nearly yearly.

Classification
Following Wilson (2011)

Subfamily Psiloxyloideae
 tribe Psiloxyleae
 tribe Heteropyxideae

Subfamily Myrtoideae
 tribe Xanthostemoneae
 tribe Lophostemoneae
 tribe Osbornieae
 tribe Melaleuceae
 tribe Kanieae
 tribe Backhousieae
 tribe Metrosidereae
 tribe Tristanieae
 tribe Syzygieae
 tribe Myrteae
 tribe Eucalypteae
 tribe Syncarpieae
 tribe Lindsayomyrteae
 tribe Leptospermeae
 tribe Chamelaucieae

Genera 

 Abbevillea
 Actinodium
 Agonis
 Algrizea
 Allosyncarpia
 Aluta
 Amomyrtella
 Amomyrtus
 Angasomyrtus
 Angophora
 Archirhodomyrtus
 Arillastrum
 Astartea
 Asteromyrtus
 Astus
 Austromyrtus
 Babingtonia
 Backhousia
 Baeckea
 Balaustion
 Barongia
 Basisperma
 Beaufortia
 Blepharocalyx
 Callistemon
 Calothamnus
 Calycolpus
 Calycorectes
 Calyptranthes
 Calyptrogenia
 Calytrix
 Campomanesia
 Chamelaucium
 Chamguava
 Cheyniana
 Choricarpia
 Cleistocalyx
 Cloezia
 Conothamnus
 Corymbia
 Corynanthera
 Curitiba
 Cyathostemon
 Darwinia
 Decaspermum
 Enekbatus
 Eremaea
 Ericomyrtus
 Eucalyptopsis
 Eucalyptus
 Eugenia
 Euryomyrtus
 Gomidesia
 Gossia
 Harmogia
 Heteropyxis
 Hexachlamys
 Homalocalyx
 Homalospermum
 Homoranthus
 Hottea
 Hypocalymma
 Kanakomyrtus
 Kania
 Kardomia
 Kjellbergiodendron
 Kunzea
 Lamarchea
 Legrandia
 Lenwebbia
 Leptospermum
 Lindsayomyrtus
 Lithomyrtus
 Lophomyrtus
 Lophostemon
 Luma
 Lysicarpus
 Malleostemon
 Marlierea
 Melaleuca
 Meteoromyrtus
 Metrosideros
 Micromyrtus
 Mitranthes
 Mitrantia
 Mosiera
 Myrceugenia
 Myrcia
 Myrcianthes
 Myrciaria
 Myrrhinium
 Myrtastrum
 Myrtella
 Myrteola
 Myrtus
 Neofabricia
 Neomitranthes
 Neomyrtus
 Ochrosperma
 Octamyrtus
 Osbornia
 †Paleomyrtinaea
 Paragonis
 Pericalymma
 Phymatocarpus
 Pileanthus
 Pilidiostigma
 Pimenta
 Pleurocalyptus
 Plinia
 Pseudanamomis
 Psidium
 Psiloxylon
 Purpureostemon
 Regelia
 Rhodamnia
 Rhodomyrtus
 Rinzia
 Ristantia
 Sannantha
 Scholtzia
 Seorsus
 Siphoneugena
 Sphaerantia
 Stenostegia
 Stereocaryum
 Stockwellia
 Syncarpia
 Syzygium
 Taxandria
 Thaleropia
 Thryptomene
 Triplarina
 Tristania
 Tristaniopsis
 Ugni
 Uromyrtus
 Verticordia
 Waterhousea
 Welchiodendron
 Whiteodendron
 Xanthomyrtus
 Xanthostemon

Foraging 

Myrtaceae is foraged by many stingless bees, especially by species such as Melipona bicolor which gather pollen from this plant family. Some Australian species such as Tetragonula hockingsi And Tetragonula carbonaria are also known to collect resin from the mature seed pods of Corymbia torelliana, resulting in Mellitochory as the seeds get stuck onto the corbiculae of the bees and sometimes be successfully disposed of by colony members that remove them. But usually, they are known to get stuck in the hives or near hive entrances instead in most cases hence also making it a  minor nuisance for some keepers as they can take up a lot of space. Fortunately, this is only known to occur in the eastern areas of Australia, but could occur in other neighbouring countries where some Corymbia species are known to be native.

References

External links 

 
Myrtales families